Charles Oluka is an officer at the rank of colonel in the Uganda People's Defence Force (UPDF). He is the Director General of the Internal Security Organisation, effective 8 October 2020. Before that, he served as the Director of technical services at the spy agency until 2018.

Military career
On 8 October 2020, President Yoweri Museveni appointed him as the substantive Director general of the Internal Security Organisation. He replaced Colonel Kaka Bagyenda, who, together with his deputy Don Mugimba, were relieved of their positions. Colonel Oluka is deputized by Taban Amin, one the sons of former Ugandan  president Idi Amin.

See also
 Elly Kayanja
 Jim Muhwezi
 Henry Tumukunde

Order of succession

References

External links
ISO helping Police track down killers of Muslim Sheikhs
ISO to Kaka  operatives:  Return guns As of 12 October 2020.

Year of birth missing (living people)
Living people
People from Northern Region, Uganda
Ugandan military personnel